The 1992 Aden hotel bombings were two terrorist bomb attacks carried out by al-Qaeda on December 29, 1992, that were intended to kill United States Marines in Aden, Yemen. It is considered to be the first attack on the United States by Al-Qaeda, though the objective was unsuccessful.

Attacks
On December 29, 1992, the Islamist terrorist group al-Qaeda detonated a bomb at the Gold Mohur Hotel in Aden, Yemen, where United States Marine Corps would be staying while on their way to Somalia to participate in Operation Restore Hope. This is considered to be the first attack on the United States by al-Qaeda, though the objective was unsuccessful, as the troops had already left before the bomb was detonated. However, an Austrian tourist and a hotel employee were killed and four Austrian tourists were injured.

A second bomb detonated prematurely at the Aden Mövenpick Hotel, where other United States Marines had also been staying, and three people were injured, none of whom were Americans. At the time, the bombings did not give the United States cause for concern because no Americans had died. In April 1993, intelligence believed that Osama bin Laden had a role in the attacks. Immediately after the bombings, the US announced the withdrawal of troops from Yemen, the place it was using to support operations in Somalia.

Motives
Al-Qaeda intended this first attack against the United States as part of a larger campaign. At the time, the United States had been intervening in Somalia in an effort to stabilize the country and get aid to those who were in need during a military campaign known as Operation Restore Hope. Earlier in 1992, al-Qaeda allegedly was training Somali militants to fight against US forces. Links have been made between this training and the devastation of the Battle of Mogadishu in 1993, which resulted in 18 deaths and 80 wounded US troops. In March 1997, bin Laden said, "With Allah’s grace, Muslims over there cooperated with some Arab mujahideen who were in Afghanistan… against the American occupation troops and killed large numbers of them," in an interview on CNN.

In 1998, bin Laden would take credit for the bombings, claiming, "The United States wanted to set up a military base for US soldiers in Yemen, so that it could send fresh troops to Somalia… The Arab mujaheddin related to the Afghan jihad carried out two bomb explosions in Yemen to warn the United States, causing damage to some Americans staying in those hotels. The United States received our warning and gave up the idea of setting up its military bases in Yemen. This was the first al-Qaeda victory scored against the Crusaders." This was not entirely true, since no Americans were injured or killed, nor did the United States recognize this action as a warning. At the time, "The troops went on to Somalia as scheduled, but the triumphant leaders of al-Qaeda said that they had frightened the Americans away and scored an easy victory."

References

1992 murders in Asia
1992 hotel bombings
Al-Qaeda attacks
Attacks on buildings and structures in 1992
Attacks on buildings and structures in Yemen
Attacks on hotels in Asia
December 1992 crimes
December 1992 events in Asia
Improvised explosive device bombings in 1992
Improvised explosive device bombings in Yemen
Islamic terrorism in Yemen
Islamic terrorist incidents in 1992
1992 bombings
1992 hotel bombings
Terrorist incidents in Yemen in 1992
Hotel bombings